Frode Andresen (born 9 September 1973) is a former Norwegian biathlete and cross-country skier.

Early life
Andresen was born in the Netherlands, and lived one year each in Cape Town, South Africa; Lagos, Nigeria; and Nairobi, Kenya, because of his parents' careers. They settled in Norway when Frode was four, and a year later he learnt to cross-country ski, taking up biathlon when he was twelve.

Biathlon career
Andresen started competing in 1985 and has 15 World cup victories. In all Andresen had 47 podium finishes, 15 1st (including three wins at the Holmenkollen ski festival biathlon competition with two sprint wins (2000, 2001) and one pursuit (2001)), 15 2nd and 17 3rd places. On the January 22, 2006, Frode Andresen won the Golden Cup, which is a trophy awarded to the biathlete with the most points during the three world cup events after Christmas. Andresen is one of the fastest skiers in the field, but his shooting accuracy is questionable, his 03/04 season shooting statistics were 72% in the prone, and 67% standing, whilst the top biathletes are in the high 80% range.

On 14 February  2006 Andresen won the bronze medal in the 10 km sprint in the 2006 Winter Olympics in a time of 26:31.3, 19.7 seconds behind winner Sven Fischer of Germany, having missed one target out of ten. This gave him a complete set of medals in his olympic career.

Andresen's last competition at the World Cup level was the sprint in Hochfilzen 15 December 2011 in the 2011–12 season.
Andresen's last competition at the IBU Cup level was the sprint in Beitostølen 1 December 2012 in the 2012–13 season.

Cross-country career
A skilled and versatile skier, Andresen also participates in FIS cross-country skiing competitions. One of his best achievements in this sport is the first place in 20 km Freestyle race on 1999 Norwegian national championship which took place in Lillehammer.

Personal life 
Frode lives with fellow biathlete Gunn Margit Andreassen, and they had a son together, David, who was born around Christmas 2004, but died January 1, 2018. They also have two younger sons, Nicolai and Elias. He has a degree in economics and lists monitoring the stock market as a hobby of his. Frode is an avid cyclist, coming 26th at the 2002 Norwegian Championships in road cycling. As a child he cracked several teeth while skateboarding.

Biathlon results
All results are sourced from the International Biathlon Union.

Olympic Games
3 medals (1 gold, 1 silver, 1 bronze)

*Pursuit was added as an event in 2002, with mass start being added in 2006.

World Championships
9 medals (2 gold, 2 silver, 5 bronze)

*During Olympic seasons competitions are only held for those events not included in the Olympic program.
**Team was removed as an event in 1998, and pursuit was added in 1997 with mass start being added in 1999 and the mixed relay in 2005.

Individual victories
15 victories (11 Sp, 4 Pu)

*Results are from UIPMB and IBU races which include the Biathlon World Cup, Biathlon World Championships and the Winter Olympic Games.

Cross-country skiing results
All results are sourced from the International Ski Federation (FIS).

World Cup

Season standings

Team podiums 
 1 podium – (1 )

References

External links 
 
 
 Wintersport biography
 Holmenkollen biathlon information

1973 births
Living people
Norwegian male biathletes
Norwegian male cross-country skiers
Biathletes at the 1998 Winter Olympics
Biathletes at the 2002 Winter Olympics
Biathletes at the 2006 Winter Olympics
Olympic biathletes of Norway
Medalists at the 1998 Winter Olympics
Medalists at the 2002 Winter Olympics
Medalists at the 2006 Winter Olympics
Olympic medalists in biathlon
Olympic bronze medalists for Norway
Olympic silver medalists for Norway
Olympic gold medalists for Norway
Biathlon World Championships medalists
Holmenkollen Ski Festival winners
People from Ringerike (municipality)
Sportspeople from Viken (county)